= Roadstarr Motorsport =

Roadstarr Motorsports, Inc., is a vehicle refining company based in Los Angeles, California.

== History ==
Roadstarr Motorsports, Inc., was founded in 2001 by Ghanaian twins Hassan and Hussein Iddrissu. Hussein and Hassan moved to London from Accra, Ghana, at age 10, where they both attended boarding school. They moved to the United States for college and opened their first Roadstarr Motorsports at age 23 in Los Angeles, California. John Travolta, Ralph Lauren, Kevin Spacey and Akon became frequent clients. The company expanded to a location in Santa Monica in 2002, and sales revenue hit $6 million in 2006. It catered to Michael Jackson and Shaquille O'Neal in 2008 and made $13M in 2009. The two entrepreneurs were awarded the B.E NEXT Small Business Award.
